The Shell Shocked Egg is a 1948 Warner Bros. Merrie Melodies cartoon directed by Robert McKimson. The short was released on July 10, 1948.

The plot concerns a baby turtle named Clem who is only partly hatched and looks for a place to finish hatching while running into a dog and rooster who break out into a feud over ownership of the egg while Clem's family looks for him at the beach.  The plot of a partly hatched baby animal experiencing misadventures in completing his hatching is loosely based on Frank Tashlin's Booby Hatched, released in 1944.

Plot
At the beach, a mother turtle, singing to the tune of "The Arkansas Traveler" (the main theme music for this short), brings down her four eggs and finds a good place to hatch them out.  She sticks out four signs for the baby turtles' names (Tom, Dick, Harry, Clem) and begins digging holes for the eggs.  At that moment, a human (from offscreen) holds up a nature note to explain to the audience that what we're seeing is a fact: turtles bury their eggs in the sand so that the hot sun can hatch them out.  The mother turtle sees this, scolds the human for sticking in that piece of trivia (claiming people already know that), and leaves to fetch a sunlamp.

While the mother turtle is gone, Clem's egg pops out from under the sand and Clem sticks his legs out of the shell (thanks to the sun), but dark clouds immediately cover up the sun.  Upset at being only "half-hatched", Clem goes to look for something to continue hatching himself out.  He comes to a road just near the beach and starts to cross over to the other side, but nearly gets run over by two cars going in different directions and shouts out at them.  Meanwhile, Clem's mother returns with the sunlamp (having anticipated the unexpected cloud cover), places it over the eggs (unaware of the missing Clem), and starts knitting while the sunlamp takes over the sun's work.

Over in the country, Clem comes across a pond (where he dips in his toe) and, despite being unable to see through the eggshell, leaps across the pond, thanks to a couple of stones and a turtle unexpectedly surfacing from underneath the water (though he wonders where the egg came from afterward).  Next, Clem comes across a farm and finds a cow fast asleep, deducing the cow is probably warm enough for him to continue hatching, but the cow uses her tail like a swatter to try to hit Clem.  When that doesn't work, she uses her tail to set Clem up like a golf ball and (turning the tail into a golf club) hits Clem to a barn where he goes down the waterspout and hits the foot of a horse.  As Clem wishes aloud for something to break open the shell, he, at the same time, narrowly avoids getting stomped on by the horse as the horse begins walking.

Back at the beach, Clem's mother finishes knitting just in time to see the eggs beginning to hatch.  In perfect harmony, Tom, Dick, and Harry hatch singing out their names one by one and together as a group.  Clem's mother tells them to come along, but just as they start to leave the beach, she suddenly gets a funny feeling that something's off.  She counts up her babies and on her fingers twice (coming up to three on the babies and four on the eggs) and does the sum on an adding machine, to which she realizes to her horror that Clem is missing.  Going into a blind panic, Clem's mother takes the shovel and starts digging in the spot where Clem's egg was while Tom, Dick, and Harry join the search with smaller shovels and singing to the tune of "Working on the Railroad".

On the farm, Clem gets under the farm dog and leaves him, lamenting on losing good hatching spots.  At first, the dog brushes off "laying an egg" as a dream, but suddenly realizing it wasn't a dream, he begins fantasizing about being the only dog to lay an egg and the fame and fortune that could come from such a feat.  He then tries to sit on Clem, but Clem dodges him.  Clem then wanders into the hen-house and snuggles under a hen.  The dog comes into "reclaim" Clem, but the hen catches him in the act and cries out for help.  The dog slaps the hen and scolds her for stealing the egg, but the hen still cries out for help.  Just as the dog leaves the hen-house, the rooster shows up, forcing the dog to hide Clem.  When the rooster demands to know where the stolen egg is, the dog holds out empty hands, having hidden Clem behind his back, but the rooster catches onto the ruse, pounds the dog on the head, and "reclaims" Clem.  The scene briefly shifts back to the beach where Clem's mother is now digging a hole within a hole and Clem's brothers doing the same thing with their hole and singing to the tune of "Where has my little dog gone?"

Back at the farm, the dog takes a rain barrel and, just as the rooster passes by with Clem, drops the barrel on him to trap him.  The dog then reaches in through a hole to try and take back Clem, but the rooster hits the dog's hand and laughs at it.  Angered, the dog rushes away, takes a pole, and uses it to repeatedly poke the rooster through the hole in order to get him to surrender Clem.  Fortunately, the rooster gives up and hands back Clem.  Over at the beach, Clem's mother has now resorted to using a steam shovel to dig up the beach in her search and Clem's brothers are using a toy steam shovel in their search as well while singing to "Brother Clem"

Over at the farm, the dog comes across a large white box with a sign that reads "Warning!  Do not look into this box!"  Rather than walk on, the dog lets his curiosity get the better of him and opens it, revealing the rooster hiding inside.  Stunned, the dog tries to get the words of how the rooster escaped the barrel out of his mouth, but the rooster seizes him and pulls him into the box.  The box then shakes as the dog and rooster begin beating each other up over possession of Clem, but during the brawl, Clem escapes from the box and makes a beeline back to the beach.  First the dog and then the rooster notice this and also jump out of the box and pursue Clem.  As the three of them get down to the beach and pass the pit already dug by Clem's mother, Clem's mother sees the chase and, thinking both the dog and rooster kidnapped Clem, uses the steam shovel's bucket to catch them and Clem.  Once they're down, Clem's mother reclaims Clem and, with a mallet, whacks both the dog and rooster over the head, leaving them dazed.

At that moment, Clem starts shouting for his mother to get him out of the shell.  At the same time, relieved to have their brother back, Tom, Dick, and Harry also tell their mother to get Clem out of the shell.  Quickly, Clem's mother uses the sunlamp to provide some more heat for Clem.  Finally, the eggshell breaks and Clem sticks his head out of his turtle shell, at which his joy over finally hatching becomes short-lived when he sees that he's been born an animal that has to spend its life in a shell, at which he cries "Aww, wouldn't you just know it?  I'm still in a gosh dang shell!" to end the short.

Home media
This film is available on the laserdisc set The Golden Age of Looney Tunes.

References

1948 animated films
1948 short films
1948 films
Merrie Melodies short films
Films directed by Robert McKimson
Films scored by Carl Stalling
1940s Warner Bros. animated short films
Films about turtles